John Harry (fl. 1410) was an English politician.

He was a Member (MP) of the Parliament of England for Hastings in 1410.

References

14th-century births
15th-century deaths
English MPs 1410